Plas Machynlleth is the former Welsh residence of the Marquesses of Londonderry. It is situated in the market town of Machynlleth in Powys (formerly Montgomeryshire), Wales. It was brought into the family following the 1846 marriage of the then Viscount Seaham (who later became, in March 1854, Earl Vane, and in November 1872 the 5th Marquess of Londonderry) to Mary Cornelia Edwards, who inherited it on the death of her father, Sir John Edwards, in 1850. Sir John had extended and renamed the house. It is a Grade II* listed building and its gardens, now mainly a public park, are listed on the Cadw/ICOMOS Register of Parks and Gardens of Special Historic Interest in Wales.

History
The house became the family home of the 5th Marquess. His eldest son Charles left Machynlleth on succeeding to the Marquessate. The house was then lived in by his youngest son, Lord Herbert Vane-Tempest. After Lord Herbert was killed in the Abermule train collision on 26 January 1921  no family members lived there. After the Second World War, The 7th Marquess of Londonderry, a prominent Ulster Unionist politician, gave the mansion and its estate to the town. It adapted the house for use as council offices.

The oldest parts of the house date to the seventeenth century; the main entrance front was added in 1853. The house was called Greenfields for many years. It was later renamed after the town. In 1995, after a £3 million refurbishment, funded by Montgomeryshire District Council and the European Union, the building became the 'Celtica' heritage centre. It also had space to support conferences. For several years the centre was successful in attracting tourist and educational visits and conferences. The mansion was taken over by the new unitary authority, Powys County Council. With little investment by the council and with declining visitor numbers, the council decided to close the centre in 2006. It cited a loss of £1.1 million between 1998 and its closure. The Plas is now used as a community and meetings venue. The gardens are listed at Grade II on the Cadw/ICOMOS Register of Parks and Gardens of Special Historic Interest in Wales.

See also
Other residences of the Marquesses of Londonderry:
Londonderry House in London
Mount Stewart in County Down
Seaham Hall in County Durham
Wynyard Park in County Durham
Woollet Hall in Kent
Garron Tower in County Antrim

References

Country houses in Powys
Grade II* listed buildings in Powys
Registered historic parks and gardens in Powys
Machynlleth